Protorhiza is a genus of moth in the family Cosmopterigidae. It contains only one species, Protorhiza cyanosticta, which is found in the Philippines (Luzon).

References

External links
Natural History Museum Lepidoptera genus database

Cosmopterigidae